Maurice Lamontagne,  (September 7, 1917 – June 12, 1983) was a Canadian economist and politician.

Born in Mont-Joli, Quebec, he graduated from Université Laval with a master's degree in social science and Harvard University with a master's in economics. He was a professor of economics at Université Laval. In 1954, he became an assistant deputy minister in the Department of Northern Affairs and National Resources headed by Jean Lesage. In 1957, he joined the faculty of the University of Ottawa as a professor of economics. From 1958 to 1963, he served as an adviser to Lester Pearson.

In 1958, he ran unsuccessfully as the Liberal candidate for the House of Commons of Canada in the riding of Quebec East. He was defeated again in 1962. He was elected in 1963 in the riding of Outremont—St-Jean and re-elected in 1965. From 1963 to 1964, he was the President of the Privy Council. From 1964 to 1965, he was the Secretary of State of Canada.

He was a member of the Club of Rome.

In 1967, he was called to the Senate of Canada representing the senatorial division of Inkerman, Quebec. He served until his death in 1983.

The Maurice Lamontagne Institute is named in his honour.

There is a Maurice Lamontagne fonds at Library and Archives Canada.

References

External links
 
 Maurice Lamontagne at The Canadian Encyclopedia

1917 births
1983 deaths
20th-century Canadian civil servants
Harvard University alumni
Université Laval alumni
Canadian senators from Quebec
Liberal Party of Canada MPs
Liberal Party of Canada senators
Members of the House of Commons of Canada from Quebec
Members of the King's Privy Council for Canada
Academic staff of the University of Ottawa
Academic staff of Université Laval
20th-century Canadian economists